Tetramorium microgyna is a species of ant in the genus Tetramorium. It is found in South Africa and Zimbabwe.

References

microgyna
Hymenoptera of Africa
Insects described in 1918
Taxonomy articles created by Polbot